Fader may refer to:

 Fader (audio engineering), a device for gradually increasing or decreasing the level of an audio signal

Music 
 "Fader" (Paradise Lost song), 2001
 "Fader" (The Temper Trap song), 2009
 Fader Label, an American independent record label 
 The Faders, a British female pop rock band 2004-06

Other uses
 Fader (surname)
 The Fader, an American music, culture, and fashion publication

See also 
 Fade (disambiguation)
 Fade in (disambiguation)
 Fade out (disambiguation)
 Faded (disambiguation)
 Feder (disambiguation)